is a former Japanese football player. He played for the Japan national team. He is current president of the Japan Football Association.

Club career
Tashima was born in Amakusa District, Kumamoto on November 21, 1957. In 1976, he won the Japanese high school championship with his team from Urawa-South high school. After which he then studies sports science at the University of Tsukuba. After graduating from University of Tsukuba, he joined Furukawa Electric in 1980. The club won the 2nd place in 1982 JSL Cup. Although he played as a regular player, he retired in 1982. He played 39 games and scored 6 goals in the league.

National team career
On June 27, 1979, when Tashima was a University of Tsukuba student, he debuted for Japan national team against Malaysia. He also played in 1980. He played 7 games and scored 1 goal for Japan until 1980.

After retirement
Afterwards, he studied from 1983 to 1986 at the German Sport University Cologne and received a B coaching license. As he returned, he was a technical coach for the football club of his alma mater, and taught for several years at Rikkyo University. In 2001, he coached the Japan U-17 national team, to which he led for the first time since 1995 in the first round of the 2001 U-17 World Championship.

In July 2010, Tashima served as vice-president of Japan Football Association (JFA). Since January 2011, he has been a member of the Asian Football Confederation Executive Committee. He has been a FIFA Council member since April 2015. In March 2016, he became president of JFA. In April 2016, he also became president of East Asian Football Federation and served until March 2018.

Tashima was diagnosed with COVID-19 on 17 March 2020.

Club statistics

National team statistics

Honours
Medal with Blue Ribbon (2020)

References

External links
 
 Japan National Football Team Database

1957 births
Living people
University of Tsukuba alumni
Association football people from Kumamoto Prefecture
Japanese footballers
Japan international footballers
Japan Soccer League players
JEF United Chiba players
FIFA officials
Asian Football Confederation officials
Association football midfielders
Association football forwards